Pierre Gosnat (August 20, 1948 – January 25, 2015) was a French politician who was a member of the National Assembly of France.  He represented the Val-de-Marne department,  and was a member of the Gauche démocrate et républicaine.

References

1948 births
2015 deaths
Politicians from Paris
French Communist Party politicians
Deputies of the 13th National Assembly of the French Fifth Republic